South Middleton School District is a mid-sized, rural, public school district located in Boiling Springs, Pennsylvania. It also serves residents of South Middleton Township. South Middleton School District serves grades (K–12). According to 2000 federal census data, it served a resident population of 12,939. By 2010 the population had risen to 14,695 residents. The educational attainment levels for the school district population (25 years old and over) were 92.9% high school graduates and 33.1% college graduates.

In 2009, South Middleton School District residents' per capita income was $24,370, while the median family income was $60,511 a year. In the Commonwealth, the median family income was $49,501 and the United States median family income was $49,445, in 2010. In Cumberland County, the median household income was $51,035. By 2013, the median household income in the United States rose to $52,100.

South Middleton School District operates four schools: W.G. Rice Elementary School, Iron Forge Elementary School, Yellow Breeches Middle School and Boiling Springs High School. High school students may choose to attend Cumberland Perry Area Vocational Technical School for training in the construction and mechanical trades. The district is served by the Capital Area Intermediate Unit 15, which offers a variety of services, including a completely developed K–12 curriculum that is mapped and aligned with the Pennsylvania Academic Standards (available online), shared services, a group purchasing program and a wide variety of special education and special needs services.

Extracurriculars
South Middleton School District provides a wide variety of activities, clubs and an extensive sports program.  Varsity and junior varsity athletic activities are under the Pennsylvania Interscholastic Athletic Association

Sports
The district funds:

Boys
Baseball - AAA
Basketball - AAA
Cross country - AA
Football - AA
Golf - AA
Soccer - AA
Swimming and diving - AA
Track and field - AA
Wrestling - AA

Girls
Basketball - AAA
Cross country - AA
Field hockey - AA
Soccer - AA
Softball - AAA
Swimming and diving - AA
Track and field - AA
Volleyball - AA

Middle school sports

Boys
Basketball
Cross country
Football
Track and field
Wrestling 

Girls
Basketball
Cross country
Field hockey
Track and field
Volleyball 

According to PIAA directory July 2012

References

External links
 The official South Middleton School District web site
School Stats

Education in Harrisburg, Pennsylvania
Susquehanna Valley
School districts in Cumberland County, Pennsylvania